Amanda Galafres Patterson Walker (born 29 November 1935) is an English film and television actress.

Career 
Amanda Walker trained at the Central School of Speech and Drama in London. She is notable for roles in 28 Weeks Later, Heat and Dust, A Room with a View, Pollyanna and Churchill and the Generals.

Overall, Amanda Walker has appeared in over 100 film and television productions since 1959 and is still active as an actress as of 2018.  In 1990, she appeared in the Agatha Christie's Poirot episode "The Cornish Mystery", an adaptation of Agatha Christie's short story of the same name.

Personal life 
Amanda Walker is the daughter of Madeleine Christie. She is married to fellow actor Patrick Godfrey since 1960, they have two children. Their daughter Kate Godfrey is Head of Voice for the Royal Shakespeare Company.

Filmography

Film

Television

References

External links

1935 births
Living people
British actresses
British film actresses
British television actresses
Place of birth missing (living people)